"Stay" is a song by UK-based pop act Shakespears Sister, released by London Records in January 1992 as the second single from their second album, Hormonally Yours (1992). The single was written by Siobhan Fahey, Marcella Detroit, and Dave Stewart (under the pseudonym "Jean Guiot"), and became a massive hit. It is the duo's first and only number-one single in numerous territories, including the UK, where it topped the UK Singles Chart for eight consecutive weeks and was the fourth-biggest-selling single of 1992. "Stay" also reached No. 1 in Sweden and in band member Siobhan Fahey's birthplace, Ireland. It was a transatlantic hit as well, reaching No. 4 on both the US Billboard Hot 100 and the Canadian RPM Top Singles chart.

At the 1993 Brit Awards "Stay" won the award for British Video of the Year. In November 2010, The X Factor contestant Cher Lloyd performed the song on series 7 of the show. Following this, the original version re-entered the UK, Ireland and the European Hot 100 Singles charts. As well as being used on The X Factor, the song has also been featured on Britain's Got Talent, Dancing on Ice, Strictly Come Dancing and  The Voice UK.

Composition
"Stay" was written by Siobhan Fahey, Marcella Detroit, and Dave Stewart. The song was inspired by the film Cat-Women of the Moon; Stewart conceived the idea of the Cat-Women singing about an earthling that she had fallen in love with, and suggested writing the song to Detroit and Fahey. According to Detroit, Stewart and Fahey used to host parties where she invariably ended up performing ballads with famous guests who showed up at their parties, so Stewart suggested writing a ballad that features her on lead vocals. They rewrote the song "maybe four times." Once they finished writing the song, they recorded a demo and took it to Fahey's home. There the producer Chris Thomas, who had been working with Stewart, listened to the demo and said "No.1 smash!", to which they replied "Really?"

The song was produced by Alan Moulder and Chris Thomas; Thomas helped to produce the final remix when they felt the song was not working. Jennifer Maidman of Penguin Cafe Orchestra created the arrangement for synthesiser in the chorus.
"Stay" is the only Shakespears Sister song that features Marcella Detroit on lead chorus, with Detroit singing the verses and Fahey singing the bridge. This would cause tension with Fahey when the song was selected by the record label as the lead single as Fahey felt the song was not typical of the album.  Detroit sings in whistle register before the last chorus of the song, going up to a high F (F6). The piano, synth and bass guitar were performed by Ian aka Jennifer Maidman, and the drums by Steve Ferrera, both musicians whose contributions featured throughout the Hormonally Yours album.

Critical reception
The song received favorable reviews from most music critics. AllMusic editor Tom Demalon said in his review of Hormonally Yours, that "everything was lost in the wake of the lovely, dramatic "Stay", a global smash." Christopher Kramer from American Eagle noted that the song "has lyrics that ring of their gospel interests." Larry Flick from Billboard described it as a "complex modern-pop tune" and noted further that the "vocal tradeoff between Marcella Detroit and Siobhan Fahey is both intense and dramatic." Clark and DeVaney from Cashbox felt it's "almost like two separate songs, representing the different influences the pair bring to their music. The first half is Marcie's reverent and angelic sounding voice, then out of the blue, comes the industrial clammer of heavy percussion and Siobhan's rough-edged bridge." Dave Sholin from the Gavin Report stated, "This haunting ballad proves they haven't changed course as they deliver a melody that has true staying power." The magazine's Rufer & Fell wrote that the female duo "gives a once-in-a-lifetime performance of a moody and deliberate song about staying power in a relationship." Chuck Campbell from Knoxville News-Sentinel described it as a "disarmingly sweet ballad" and added that it "segues into a stern warning ("I'll go anywhere with you/I'll do anything it takes/But if you try to go it alone/Don't think I'll understand") then concludes rather sinisterly." 

Sally Margaret Joy from Melody Maker complimented it as a "pretty hymn about human frailty", adding, "Yes, it's got a great hook, with Marcella's voice quavering up high and tremulously." Pan-European magazine Music & Media felt that Detroit's vibrato "gives the tune the ethereal ambiance of classic Marianne Faithfull material. Towards the end of the song Fahey takes over with her slightly darker voice." In the review of the single, they remarked that "after a slow start backed by minimal arrangements, this serious ballad slowly acquires some bite." Terry Staunton from New Musical Express opined that they "are trying a little too hard to be the Thelma & Louise of weirdo-chick-bubblegum-pop these days." Lucy O'Brien from Select stated that Detroit "makes a brave stab at the anthemic ballad with "Stay", but ends up sounding suspiciously like Jennifer Rush." Sian Pattenden from Smash Hits felt it "sounds like a hymn". A reviewer from St. Petersburg Times deemed the song "the year's best single" and commented, "'You'd better hope and pray/That you make it safe/Back to your own world.' Just try to ignore former Bananarama B-girl Siobhan Fahey, as she growls like a master berating her slave".

Retrospective response
Daily Vault's Michael R. Smith declared "Stay" as a "masterpiece", writing that the song managed to "show the world just what could be done to an otherwise mundane and ordinary ballad. It not only turned the entire pop formula on its ear, it totally blew the possibilities wide open." Tom Ewing of Freaky Trigger remarked "the teetering, cracking soprano" of Detroit's lead vocal, and Fahey's "growled and throaty intervention" on the bridge. He also felt that "obviously, the switched-dynamics form of the song matches its content: a tale of two worlds, the singer's and the subject's, and the relationship between them. One is claustrophobic, intense, something to escape: the other reached by risky passage, but where safety is hardly guaranteed and worse terrors may lurk." Imran Khan of PopMatters called it a "weird sci-fi ballad of gothic-gospel electronica". In his review of their 2019 compilation album, Singles Party, Christopher Smith from Talk About Pop Music described it as "haunting" and "epic".

Music video

Background, development, and release
British director Sophie Muller directed the promo video for the single, the concept of which was also inspired by the film Cat-Women of the Moon (1953). The video featured Detroit and Fahey fighting over a comatose man (played by Dave Evans, former boyfriend of Fahey's Bananarama bandmate Keren Woodward). Fahey described her looks as "unhinged Victorian heroine meets Suzi Quatro meets Labelle", an angel of death "in dark makeup coming down the stairs from another dimension". The part where Fahey walks down the stairs was inspired by Powell and Pressburger's film A Matter of Life and Death (1946).

The video won Best Video at the 1993 Music Week Awards and Brit Awards, and was the subject of a spoof by comedians French & Saunders. The video was featured in the Top 100 Music Videos of all time by Channel 4.

Synopsis
In some rare versions the beginning quotes a variation of the opening of William Shakespeare's Macbeth: The original quote of the play ("When shall we three meet again") is changed to "When shall we two meet again", referring to the story told in the video.

The video starts with a view of a calm night sky wherein a shooting star passes over a full moon and the song begins. The camera pans back into what appears to be a hospital room showing Marcella Detroit and her lover (Evans), who is in a coma and on the verge of death. As Detroit tends to him, she sings to him not to leave her. At the bridge of the song, a portal opens and the angel of death, played by Fahey, appears at the top of a staircase, wearing a sparkling catsuit. She dances around in front of a bright light whilst mocking Detroit that she cannot save her lover and the best she can hope for is to return safely to her own world. Detroit tries her best to wake the man up, while Death slowly makes her way down the stairs to claim his soul. The two women begin fighting over the man, making it literally and figuratively a fight between life (Detroit) and death (Fahey). During their struggle, the man finally wakes up, and he and Detroit embrace while Death, having failed to seduce him into her realm, walks away in disgust and goes back up the staircase to the light, presumably being the stairway to Heaven.

Track listings

 UK 7-inch and cassette single
 "Stay" (radio mix) – 3:48
 "The Trouble with Andre" – 4:03

 UK CD single 1
 "Stay" (LP version) – 3:48
 "Dirty Mind" (E-Zee remix) – 6:25
 "Run Silent" (Revolution remix) – 7:16 
 Excerpts from Hormonally Yours – 6:02

 UK CD single 2
 "Stay" – 3:48
 "Stay" (LP version) – 3:50
 "The Trouble with Andre" – 4:44

 US CD single
 "Stay" (LP version) – 3:47
 "Remember My Name" – 3:35
 Special previews ("Catwoman"; "Goodbye Cruel World"; "I Don't Care")

 US cassette single
A1. "Stay" – 3:47
A2. Special previews ("Catwoman"; "Goodbye Cruel World"; "I Don't Care")
B1. "The Trouble with Andre" – 4:03

Charts

Weekly charts

Year-end charts

Certifications and sales

In popular culture
The video was partly spoofed by Mr. Blobby for his 1993 Christmas number one single music video 
Featured in the 2000s paranormal television series Ghost Whisperer, season 4, episode 13 ("Body of Water").
Sweetbox covered the song on their 2002 album, Jade.
Cradle of Filth covered the song on their 2006 album Thornography 
Cher Lloyd performed the song to great acclaim on the Halloween edition of The X Factor 2010 resulting in the song re-entering the UK Top 20. 
The song was performed during The Voice UK (series 7) by Lauren Bannon.
The song was performed by Bananarama on their The Original Lineup Tour in 2017, with Keren Woodward and Sarah Dallin singing the verses originally sung by Marcella Detroit, and Siobhan Fahey singing her original bridge.
Comedy duo Dawn French and Jennifer Saunders created a parody sketch of the song's music video in their TV series French and Saunders in 1993.
Jake Quickenden skated to the song in the 2018 semi-final of Dancing on Ice
The characters of Jenny Joyce and Aisling impersonated the duo in the series 3 episode of Derry Girls, “The Affair”.

References

1990s ballads
1992 singles
1992 songs
Irish Singles Chart number-one singles
London Records singles
Music videos directed by Sophie Muller
Number-one singles in Sweden
Pop ballads
Shakespears Sister songs
Song recordings produced by Alan Moulder
Song recordings produced by Chris Thomas (record producer)
Songs written by David A. Stewart
Songs written by Marcella Detroit
Songs written by Siobhan Fahey
UK Singles Chart number-one singles